Dunk is an anthropomorphic recycling bin who functions as a mascot for the National Security Agency (NSA), in order to promote recycling. He debuted in 2015.

Reception 
Dunk was criticized for his rough CGI design. He was mocked on a segment of The Daily Show With Jon Stewart.

References 

American mascots
2015 establishments in the United States